George Warren was a Canadian Anglican priest in the late 19th and early 20th Centuries.

Davidson was educated at Trinity College, Toronto and ordained in 1888. After a curacy in Bowmanville he was the incumbent at Lakefield, ON from 1889 to 1905. He was Archdeacon of  Peterborough from 1905 to 1920.

External links

References

Archdeacons of Peterborough, ON
Trinity College (Canada) alumni
20th-century Canadian Anglican priests
19th-century Canadian Anglican priests